Bilyana Pencheva (born 23 May 1997) is a Bulgarian footballer who plays as a midfielder for Women's National Championship club LP Super Sport and the Bulgaria women's national team.

International career
Pencheva capped for Bulgaria at senior level in a 0–6 friendly loss to Croatia on 14 June 2019.

References

1997 births
Living people
Women's association football midfielders
Bulgarian women's footballers
Bulgaria women's international footballers
LP Super Sport Sofia players